Adams County Christian Academy is a growing private Christian school located near the borough of Gettysburg, in Adams County, Pennsylvania, United States.  The school was founded in 1984. The school's mascot is the ram. Mission Statement: Grounded in the love of Christ, Adams County Christian Academy provides distinctive discipleship opportunities and rigorous academics for students to lead and impact their world for Jesus Christ.

References

See also
 List of high schools in Pennsylvania

1984 establishments in Pennsylvania
Christian schools in Pennsylvania
Educational institutions established in 1984
Private schools in Pennsylvania
Schools in Adams County, Pennsylvania